The Child Prodigy is a Canadian drama film, directed by Luc Dionne and released in 2010. A biographical drama about classical pianist André Mathieu, the film stars Guillaume Lebon as Mathieu in childhood and Patrick Drolet as Mathieu in adulthood.

Its cast also includes Marc Labrèche as his father Rodolphe Mathieu, Macha Grenon as his mother Mimi Gagnon Mathieu and Karine Vanasse as his sister Camillette, as well as Lothaire Bluteau, François Papineau, Isabel Richer, Catherine Trudeau, Albert Millaire, Benoît Brière and Mitsou Gélinas in supporting roles.

The film received two Jutra Award nominations at the 13th Jutra Awards in 2011, for Best Art Direction (Michel Proulx) and Best Costume Design (Francesca Chamberland).

References

External links

2010 films
2010 drama films
Canadian biographical drama films
Films directed by Luc Dionne
Films shot in Quebec
Films set in Quebec
French-language Canadian films
2010s Canadian films